Michael Schrodi (born 3 July 1977) is a German teacher and politician of the Social Democratic Party (SPD) who has been serving as a member of the Bundestag from the state of Bavaria since 2017.

Political career 
Schrodi became a member of the Bundestag in the 2017 German federal election. He is a member of the Finance Committee and the Committee on the Environment, Nature Conservation and Nuclear Safety. On the Finance Committee, he serves as his parliamentary group's rapporteur on excise taxes, taxes on tobacco and the so-called Abgeltungsteuer. He has also been his group’s spokesperson for distributive justice (2019–2021) and financial policies (since 2021).

In addition to his committee assignments, Schrodi is part of the German-Irish Parliamentary Friendship Group.

Within the SPD parliamentary group, Schrodi belongs to the Parliamentary Left, a left-wing movement.

In the negotiations to form a so-called traffic light coalition of the SPD, the Green Party and the Free Democratic Party (FDP) following the 2021 federal elections, Schrodi was part of his party's delegation in the working group on financial regulation and the national budget, co-chaired by Doris Ahnen, Lisa Paus and Christian Dürr.

Other activities 
 Education and Science Workers' Union (GEW), Member

References

External links 

  
 Bundestag biography 

1977 births
Living people
Members of the Bundestag for Bavaria
Members of the Bundestag 2017–2021
Members of the Bundestag 2021–2025
Members of the Bundestag for the Social Democratic Party of Germany
Politicians from Munich